The 2007 Copeland Borough Council election took place on 3 May 2007 to elect members of Copeland Borough Council in Cumbria, England. The whole council was up for election and the Labour Party stayed in overall control of the council.

Election result
The results saw Labour remain in control of the council after staying on 31 seats. The Conservatives made a gain of 3 seats to have 19 councillors, while just 1 independent remained.

2 Conservative candidates were unopposed.

Ward results

References

2007 English local elections
2007
2000s in Cumbria